Women in the Sahrawi Arab Democratic Republic are women who were born in, who live in, or are from the Sahrawi Arab Democratic Republic (SADR, also romanized with Saharawi) in the region of the Western Sahara or the Sahrawi refugee camps. In Sahrawi society, the women share responsibilities at every level of its community and social organization. Article 41 of the Constitution of the Sahrawi Arab Democratic Republic ensures that the state will pursue "the promotion of women and [their] political, social and cultural participation, in the construction of society and the country's development".

Clothing 
Clothing worn by the Sahrawis include the robe called as the Daraa. Women wear the headscarf known as the mefhla.

Role in refugee camps
The Polisario Front, a national liberation movement that is recognized by the United Nations as the representative of the people of Western Sahara since 1979, has attempted to modernize the society of the Sahrawi refugee camps that was set up in Tindouf Province, Algeria from 1975 to 1976, through emphasis on education, eradication of tribalism and emancipation of women. The role of Sahrawi women was central already in pre-colonial and colonial life, but was strengthened further during the war years (1975–1991), when Sahrawi women ran most of the camps' administration, while the men were fighting at the front. This together with literacy- and professional education classes produced major advances in the role of women in Sahrawi society. The return of large numbers of Sahrawi men since the cease fire in 1991 may have slowed this development according to some observers, but women still run a majority of the camps' administration, and the Sahrawi women's union UNMS is very active in promoting their role. The role of women in camps was enhanced by their shouldering of the main responsibility for the camps and government bureaucracy during the war years, as virtually the entire male population was enrolled in the Polisario army.

Politics
In the 2012 election for seats in the Sahrawi National Council, 35% of the parliamentarians were women. In the legislative election in 2008 women gained 34.61% of seats, thanks in part to a quota system.

Cultural life 
In Sahrawi culture, the role of the poet is not gendered and both men and women are recognised as accomplished poets. Poets such as Al Khadra and Hadjatu Aliat Swelm compose works inspired by the Sahrawi struggle, as well as life in Sahrawi camps. Women are the only ones in Hassani poetry (the tradition Sahrawi poetry is part of) to compose the tabr'a genre.

In musical life, women traditionally play the ardin (plural irdiwen), which is a small lap harp with between nine to fourteen strings.

See also 
National Union of Sahrawi Women (NUSW)
Polisario Front
Sahrawi refugee camps

References

External links 

 Some 120 Saharawi women benefit from an 'online' training project sponsored by the University of Valencia, University of Valencia.
 Belloso, María López and Irantzu Mendia Azkue. Local Human Development in contexts of permanent crisis: Women’s experiences in the Western Sahara, HEGOA Institute of Development and International Cooperation Studies (Bilbao), University of the Basque Country.

Society of the Sahrawi Arab Democratic Republic
Sahrawi Arab Democratic Republic
Sahrawi refugee camps
Women in Western Sahara